Vo Centar is a television show from North Macedonia hosted by Vasko Eftov. In March 2015 TV station Alsat-M stopped the airing of the show on its channel. Today the show is airing on Kanal 5 every Monday at 22:00

Season 2017/2018
On social media Mr. Eftov has announced that the new session of the show will start to air on Alfa Television on 8 October 2017.

Season 2016/2017

This season was airing on Kanal 5. After the channel decided to audio censure some words and names from the 27th of May 2017's episode, author of the program has decided not to air his show on Kanal 5 any more.

 This list is not complete.

Season 2015/2016

This season is airing on Kanal 5
 

This list in not complete

Season 2014/2015

This season aired on Alsat-M.

This list is not complete

Season 2013/2014

This season aired on Alsat-M.

This list is not complete

Season 2012/2013

This season aired on Alsat-M

This list is not complete

Season 2011/2012

This season aired on Alfa until April 2012. Later on Alsat-M.

This list is incomplete

Season 2010/2011

This season was aired on Kanal 5.

This list is not complete

Season 2009/2010

This list is incomplete

Season 2008/2009
This season was aired on Channel 5.

This list is not complete

Season 2007/2008
This season aired on Kanal 5.

This list is not complete

Season 2006/2007

This season aired on Kanal 5.

This list is not complete

See also
Milenko Nedelkovski Show
Jadi Burek
Ednooki
Eden na Eden
Television in North Macedonia

External links
 Official YouTube page

References

Macedonian television series
Macedonian Radio Television original programming